The Michigan Underwater Preserve Council (MUPC) is a private, non-profit, volunteer driven organization that oversees activities relating to the Michigan Underwater Preserves. The council was formed in order to educate divers and non-divers on the history and importance of the shipwrecks of the great lakes so that the public might assist in the preservation of Michigan's bottomland heritage.

External links
Michigan Underwater Preserves

Geography of Michigan
 
Environmental organizations based in Michigan